Interstate 80 (I-80) is a transcontinental Interstate Highway in the United States, stretching from San Francisco, California, to Teaneck, New Jersey. The segment of I-80 in California runs east from San Francisco across the San Francisco–Oakland Bay Bridge to Oakland, where it turns north and crosses the Carquinez Bridge before turning back northeast through the Sacramento Valley. I-80 then traverses the Sierra Nevada, cresting at Donner Summit, before crossing into the state of Nevada within the Truckee River Canyon. I-80 has portions designated as the Eastshore Freeway and Alan S. Hart Freeway.

Throughout California, I-80 was built along the corridor of US Route 40 (US 40), eventually replacing this designation entirely. The prior US 40 corridor itself was built along several historic corridors in California, notably the California Trail and Lincoln Highway. The route has changed from the original plans in San Francisco due to freeway revolts canceling segments of the originally planned alignment. Similarly in Sacramento, the freeway was rerouted around the city after plans to upgrade the original grandfathered route through the city to Interstate Highway standards were canceled.

Route description
I-80 is recognized as the Dwight D. Eisenhower Highway in the Western United States and a Blue Star Memorial Highway for its entire length. In California, it follows the original corridor of the Lincoln Highway from Sacramento to Reno (with minor deviations near Donner Summit). I-80 is part of the California Freeway and Expressway System and is part of the National Highway System, a network of highways that are considered essential to the country's economy, defense, and mobility by the Federal Highway Administration (FHWA). I-80 is also known as the Dutch Flat and Donner Lake Wagon Road from Emigrant Gap to Donner Lake. The segment of I-80 from Emigrant Gap to Truckee also forms part of the Yuba–Donner Scenic Byway, a National Forest Scenic Byway.

San Francisco Bay Area

According to the California Streets and Highways Code, most maps, and local signs, I-80 begins at the interchange with US 101 in San Francisco. However, federal records place the western terminus of I-80 at the western approach to the San Francisco–Oakland Bay Bridge, at the location of the Fremont Street offramp (previously known as the Terminal Separator Structure that once connected it to the Embarcadero Freeway). The federal and state governments disagree as to whether this westernmost segment of the signed Interstate, known as the San Francisco Skyway or Bayshore Viaduct, is actually part of the Interstate Highway System, although it is consistently shown as I-80 on most maps of San Francisco.

Eastshore Freeway
The Eastshore Freeway is a segment of I-80 and I-580 along the northeast shoreline of San Francisco Bay. It runs from the MacArthur Maze interchange just east of the eastern end of the San Francisco–Oakland Bay Bridge to the Carquinez Bridge. I-580 splits from the Eastshore Freeway at an interchange known locally as the "Hoffman Split" in Albany. The section of the Eastshore Freeway between the MacArthur Maze and I-580 (Hoffman) split between Albany is a wrong-way concurrency where the northbound direction is signed as I-80 east and I-580 west, while the southbound direction is signed as westbound I-80 and eastbound I-580. This segment suffers from severe traffic congestion during rush hour due to the merger of three freeways (I-80, I-580, and I-880) at the MacArthur Maze.

The Eastshore Freeway was created in the mid-1950s (construction commenced in 1954, last segment completed May 10, 1960) by reengineering the Eastshore Highway, a thoroughfare constructed in the 1930s (1934–1937) as one of the approaches to the Bay Bridge and designated as part of US 40. The Eastshore Highway began in El Cerrito at an intersection with San Pablo Avenue at Hill Street between Potrero Avenue and Cutting Boulevard, adjacent to the location today of the El Cerrito del Norte station of Bay Area Rapid Transit (BART). It was not a freeway in that access was at intersections with adjoining streets rather than by ramps. The Eastshore Highway ran from El Cerrito to the San Francisco–Oakland Bay Bridge along the same routing as today's freeway, although it was much narrower. A causeway was constructed for this purpose by filling in part of the mudflats along the bayshore. In the stretch from University to Ashby avenues in Berkeley, this resulted in the creation of an artificial lagoon which was developed by the Works Progress Administration (WPA) in the late 1930s as Aquatic Park.

The frontage road along the east side of today's Eastshore Freeway between Buchanan Street in Albany and Hearst Avenue in Berkeley retains the name "Eastshore Highway". The terminal segment of the old Eastshore Highway in El Cerrito between Potrero and San Pablo avenues is today named "Eastshore Boulevard".

Originally, the name "Eastshore Freeway" was also applied to what is today known as the "Nimitz Freeway" (I-880) from the beginning of its construction in 1947. This freeway was dedicated in 1958 to Chester W. Nimitz, and so, for a few years in the 1950s prior, the Eastshore Freeway stretched the entire length of the east shore of San Francisco Bay. Until the late 1960s, the Eastshore Freeway was also designated as part of State Route 17 (SR 17) together with the Nimitz Freeway.

Central Valley
I-80 is a six- to eight-lane freeway with carpool lanes in Fairfield between exit 39A (Red Top Road) and exit 47 (Air Base Parkway).

I-80 has changed routing in the Sacramento area. Currently, the freeway runs on a northern bypass of the city, the Beltline Freeway, that was originally designated I-880. The I-80 routing alignment was moved from a route through Sacramento, now US 50 and I-80 Business (I-80 Bus), after the proposed I-80 replacement of the North Sacramento Freeway was canceled. The Beltline Freeway runs northeast from the junction of I-80 and US 50 in West Sacramento across I-5 to its junction northeast of Sacramento with I-80 Bus (which is SR 51). SR 244 heads east as a short freeway spur from that interchange.

Sierra Nevada
Crossing the Sierra Nevada, I-80 regularly gets snow at higher elevations from fall to spring. The California Department of Transportation (Caltrans) sometimes requires vehicles to use snow tires, snow chains, or other traction devices in the mountains during and after snowstorms. Checkpoints are often set up to enforce chain restrictions on vehicles bound for icy or snowy areas. When chain restrictions are in effect, vehicles must have chains on the driving wheels, except 4WD vehicles with snow tires. Additionally, during the winter season, trucks are required to carry chains whether or not controls are in force.

I-80 crosses the Sierra Nevada crest at Donner Summit (also known as Euer Saddle) at an elevation of  westbound and  eastbound. The Donner Summit Rest Area is located at this point. The summit is located in Nevada County, California. The pass is generally open year-round; it is plowed in winter but may temporarily close during the worst snowstorms. This highway was replaced as the official trans-Sierra route by I-80 in 1964. Although the current Donner Pass is lower, Euer Saddle was chosen for the Interstate because of more gradual approaches that aided construction to Interstate Highway standards, which do not allow the sharp curves used by the Donner Pass Road.

History

Historic routing

In California I-80 was built along the line of, and eventually replaced, US 40. The US 40 designation was eliminated in the state as part of the 1964 state highway renumbering. US 40 was one of the original California routes designed in 1926, although its west end was in Oakland with US 101E (then SR 17, then I-5W, now I-580/I-880) prior to the San Francisco–Oakland Bay Bridge opening in 1936. An auto ferry ran from Berkeley to San Francisco, signed at the ferry landings for US 40. After the San Francisco–Oakland Bay Bridge's construction, US 40, along with US 50, were extended along the bridge to connect with US 101. The auto ferry service was then discontinued.

US 40 and US 50 both followed the San Francisco–Oakland Bay Bridge and the routes split on what is the present day MacArthur Maze in Oakland. US 50 continued southeast on present-day I-580 to Stockton and US 40 closely followed the route of present-day I-80. When reaching Sacramento, US 40 and US 50 rejoined, US 50 running concurrently with former US 99 from Stockton to Sacramento. US 40 then again split with US 50 in Downtown Sacramento and closely followed the route of present-day I-80 Bus, which was I-80 from 1957 to 1981, when I-80 was realigned along former I-880, routing along what was then the outskirts of Sacramento. US 40 then closely followed I-80 through the Sierra Nevada into Nevada.

A portion of old US 40 near Donner Lake is still intact and is an alternate route of I-80. It begins near Soda Springs and ends at Truckee. At one point, it travels right by Donner Lake, unlike I-80, which ascends higher in the Sierra Nevada north of historic US 40.

Construction

Original routing in San Francisco

When I-80 was first approved, it was to begin at planned I-280 (SR 1) in Golden Gate Park, head east on the never-built Panhandle Freeway, then run south and southeast on the Central Freeway (US 101) to the San Francisco Skyway. The Panhandle Freeway was to be routed through Hayes Valley, passing through Golden Gate Park and terminating at proposed I-280, now SR 1. In 1964, community oppositions forced Caltrans to abandon the Panhandle Freeway project. A January 1968 amendment moved I-280 to its present alignment, degraded I-480 to a state highway, and truncated the origin point of I-80 to the Embarcadero Freeway (then I-280, formerly I-480). Prior to that truncation, I-80 had been defined as from "Route 280 in San Francisco to the Nevada state line near Verdi, Nevada, passing near Division Street in San Francisco, passing near Oakland, via Albany, via Sacramento, passing near North Sacramento, passing near Roseville, via Auburn, via Emigrant Gap, via Truckee and via the Truckee River Canyon", and certain maps had been shown of I-80 running concurrently with US 101 to Fell Street. These changes were made on the state level later that year, but Route 80 was only truncated to US 101. (The Central Freeway remained part of US 101, and the Panhandle Freeway became SR 241. The Panhandle Freeway was later canceled in the wake of freeway revolts, and the SR 241 designation has since been reassigned to an unrelated stretch of highway in Orange County.) The San Francisco Skyway, which had already been signed as part of I-80, has remained a de facto section of I-80 to the present day and remains listed as part of the Interstate in California.

In 2000, the San Francisco Chronicle published an article about the proposed construction of a new freeway through San Francisco. According to the article, the suggested 19th Avenue tunnel would run , from Junipero Serra Boulevard through Golden Gate Park and up to Lake Street, with exits at Brotherhood Avenue, Ocean Avenue, Quintara Street, Lincoln Way, and Geary Boulevard. The Van Ness tunnel would run almost , from about Fell Street to Lombard Street, with exits at Broadway and Geary Boulevard. However, the roads would violate the long-standing general plan for San Francisco, which calls for no new highway capacity. In March 2015, this proposed route was adopted by the California Transportation Commission (CTC).

Legacy
Prior to the construction of I-80, the US 40 corridor suffered from frequent car accidents. Reasons included the many traffic signals, yield signs, and stop signs that seemed to appear out of nowhere. Caltrans listed five intersections with high accident rates and claimed construction of I-80 would reduce such accidents. According to a study done on I-80 in Vallejo from 1955 and 1956, prior to the freeway construction, and 1957 and 1958, after the freeway was constructed, the accident rate dropped 73 percent and there were 245 fewer accidents on the then-new I-80 freeway.

The new route also made traveling across the Sierra Nevada far easier. Before construction, US 40 was a two-lane undivided highway with winding turns. Driving across the Sierra Nevada became far easier with the construction of I-80 across Donner Summit since that pass is closed only for intense snowstorms.

Truncation of US 40
In 1964, Caltrans desired to reduce the number of designated routes in the California state highways system. The Interstate Highway System, designed and built starting in 1956, was adding on to the already increased number of US Routes and state highways. In result, the 1964 renumbering truncated US 50 to West Sacramento. The entire route of US 40 was deleted in the Western United States due to the completion of I-80. Also, the number "40" was duplicated along I-40, at that time, a newly built route in Southern California. I-40 was to be numbered I-30, but the American Association of State Highway and Transportation Officials (AASHTO) rejected the numbering.

The state law authorizing the renumbering was passed on September 20, 1963. Signage changes took place by July 1, 1964, and US 40 was decommissioned. US 40 was one of the first US Routes to be decommissioned completely in California.

Former alignments in Sacramento

In the Sacramento area, I-80 has been realigned to many routes. In 1964, I-80 used the old US 40/US 99E freeway, the current I-80 Bus, while, a year later, I-80 was proposed to be realigned along a new freeway that would run south of the former I-80/I-880 northeast of Sacramento, run to south of the American River, and rejoin I-80. This was necessary because the 1964 I-80 failed to meet Interstate standards.

In 1972, I-880 was completed, while a part of the new alignment of I-80 was completed but not open to traffic, where there was a long bridge to nowhere. From 1972 to 1980, I-880 began in West Sacramento as a fork from the original I-80, continues northeast over the Sacramento River to its interchange with I-5, continues east through the communities of North Sacramento and Del Paso Heights, and ends at an interchange with the Roseville Freeway (I-80). The now-designated Capital City Freeway was then the original I-80 routing, continuing southwest directly into downtown Sacramento. I-80 was then rerouted along the Beltline Freeway in 1983, while the Capital City Freeway became I-80 Bus, also I-305 and SR 51. I-880 would have intersected SR 244 and then US 50, but, in 1979, the Sacramento City Council voted to delete the proposed I-80 alignment for rail transit. The constructed I-80/SR 51/SR 244 split is now used for three railroad stations. In 1980, the new I-80 alignment was deleted from the Interstate System. In 1982–1984, I-880 was reassigned to SR 17 running from Oakland to San Jose, after two to four years of inactivity.

Bay Bridge replacement

On October 17, 1989, the Loma Prieta earthquake was responsible for 63 deaths and 3,757 injuries. The San Francisco–Oakland Bay Bridge, which is part of I-80, suffered severe damage, as a  section of the upper deck on the eastern cantilever side fell onto the deck below. The quake caused the Oakland side of the bridge to shift  to the east and caused the bolts of one section to shear off, sending the  section of roadbed crashing down like a trapdoor. Caltrans removed and replaced the collapsed section and reopened the bridge on November 18.

In 2002, due to the risk of a future large earthquake, Caltrans started building a new eastern span. The department advertised that the new span of the San Francisco–Oakland Bay Bridge used a new earthquake-resisting technique that would not collapse in an earthquake similar to the Loma Prieta earthquake. The new eastern span opened on September 2, 2013, at an estimated cost of $6.4 billion (equivalent to $ in ).

Express lanes
The project includes converting the existing  carpool lanes between Red Top Road and Air Base Parkway. Scheduled to open in 2025, the HOT lanes will use an open road tolling system, and therefore no toll booths to receive cash, with each vehicle required to carry a FasTrak transponder.

Exit list

Related routes
There are eight associated routes of I-80: seven auxiliary Interstate Highways and one business route; these routes are I-280, I-380, I-580, I-680, I-780, I-880, I-980, and I-80 Bus. Three former routes exist: I-180, I-480, and I-880.

See also

References

External links

Bay Area FasTrak – includes toll information on the Bay Bridge, Carquinez Bridge, and the other Bay Area toll facilities
 Caltrans District 4: Current major projects on Route 80
California @ AARoads.com - Interstate 80
Caltrans: Interstate 80 highway conditions
California Highways: I-80

80
080
 California
Roads in Alameda County, California
Roads in Contra Costa County, California
Roads in Napa County, California
Roads in Nevada County, California
Roads in Placer County, California
Roads in Sacramento County, California
Roads in San Francisco
Roads in Sierra County, California
Roads in Solano County, California
Roads in Yolo County, California
U.S. Route 40
U.S. Route 99